The Belgium national under-17 football team is the national under-17 football team of Belgium and is controlled by the Belgian Football Association. The team competes in the UEFA European Under-17 Championship and the FIFA U-17 World Cup. Their biggest successes have been their bronze medal at the 2015 World Cup, reaching the semi-finals of the European championship in 2007 on home soil, and again in 2015 and 2018.

Current squad
 The following players were called up for the 2023 UEFA European Under-17 Championship qualification matches.
 Match dates: 26 October – 1 November 2022
 Opposition: ,  and 
Caps and goals correct as of: 26 October 2022, after the match against

Competitive record

FIFA U-17 World Cup record

UEFA European U-17 Football Championship record 

   *  denotes draws include knockout matches decided on penalty kicks.
  indicates tournament was held on home soil.

See also

 Belgium national football team
 Belgium national under-21 football team
 Belgium national under-19 football team
 European Under-17 Football Championship
 Under-17 World Cup

References

European national under-17 association football teams
Football